Marsupella is a liverwort genus in the family Gymnomitriaceae.

References

External links

Jungermanniales
Jungermanniales genera